Roanoke  may refer to:

Places
Roanoke Colony, a former English colony that mysteriously disappeared
Roanoke Island, the location of the Roanoke colony in present-day North Carolina
Roanoke River, flowing through Virginia and North Carolina and emptying into Albemarle Sound near Roanoke Island
Roanoke Valley, part of the Great Appalachian Valley near the headwaters of the Roanoke River in Virginia
Roanoke, Alabama
Roanoke, Georgia
Roanoke, Illinois
Roanoke, Indiana
Roanoke, Louisiana
Roanoke, Missouri
Roanoke, Texas
Roanoke, Virginia, the largest US city named Roanoke
Roanoke County, Virginia
Roanoke, West Virginia
Roanoke Rapids, North Carolina
Randolph, Virginia, formerly called Roanoke

Other uses
Roanoke tribe, a Carolina Algonquian-speaking tribe in western North Carolina
Roanoke Park (Seattle), a park in Seattle, Washington
USS Roanoke, various USN vessels named Roanoke
Roanoke (ship), an American ship (1892–1905)
Roanoke College, a private liberal arts college located in Salem, Virginia
Neo Roanoke, a fictional character in Mobile Suit Gundam SEED Destiny, an anime series
Roanoke Building, a building in Chicago, Illinois
American Horror Story: Roanoke, the sixth season of the television series American Horror Story
Roanoke Station (disambiguation)